Fredric Lebow is an American screenwriter. He co-wrote the screenplay for While You Were Sleeping (1995) with Daniel G. Sullivan, but while it was acclaimed by many it did not receive any awards.  He also had a minor role in the 1991 B-movie Chopper Chicks in Zombietown. He currently resides in Long Island, New York.

Education
Lebow has a masters in film from New York University (His LinkedIn page says it was a MFA in Dramatic Writing in 1983). He received his BA in Political Science from Hofstra University in 1978. He is a 1974 graduate of Lawrence High School.

References

External links

American male film actors
American male screenwriters
Living people
1956 births
People from The Five Towns, New York
Hofstra University alumni
Lawrence High School (Cedarhurst, New York) alumni
Tisch School of the Arts alumni
Screenwriters from New York (state)